Cryptophyllium westwoodii is a species of leaf insect in the family Phylliidae.  It is distributed from southern China, the Andaman islands, Myanmar, Indo-China, Sumatra and the Riouw Archipelago.

References

External links
 
 Phasmida Species File. Brock P.

Phylliidae
Insects described in 1875
Phasmatodea of Indo-China